Cerro El Toro is a mountain in northwest side of Upata, Venezuela. It has a height of 425 metres.

Hills of Venezuela
Mountains of Bolívar (state)